Francis Cosmo Migliaccio (born October 17, 1956) is an American musician best known as a former lead singer of the bands Boston and Orion the Hunter.

Music career 
Cosmo was first featured on guitarist Barry Goudreau's self-titled solo album in 1980, a prelude to the formation of Orion the Hunter in 1983.  Orion the Hunter released an album in 1984 on Columbia Records, which yielded the hit single "So You Ran". The band opened for Aerosmith in 1984.

In 1994, Cosmo was featured as the sole lead vocalist on the platinum Boston album Walk On, which reached #7 on the Billboard Charts and produced three hit singles, including "I Need Your Love", which climbed to #4 on the Mainstream Rock Chart, and "Walk On" which reached #14.

Upon Brad Delp's return to Boston for the concert tour (Delp never missed a Boston tour prior to his death in 2007), the two shared vocals in concert, where Delp said Cosmo covered "the really tough high parts". In 1997, Cosmo was again featured on two of the songs on Boston's 'Greatest Hits' album, and took an even larger role in the 2002 album Corporate America, with the addition of co-production to his credits as vocalist.  He sang lead vocals on five of the album's songs and played guitar on one track as well.

Cosmo performed in Boston tours from 1994 to 2004, and currently performs in the band Cosmo with his son, Anton Cosmo.

He also sings in the World Classic Rockers.

Cosmo released his first album with his band in 2006, titled Alien.

Discography

with Barry Goudreau 
 Barry Goudreau (1980)

with Orion the Hunter 
 Orion the Hunter (1984)

with Boston 
 Walk On (1994)
 Greatest Hits (1997)
 Corporate America (2002)

with Cosmo 
 Alien (2006)

References

External links 
 The World Classic Rockers official website
 Fran Cosmo profile via the official Boston website
 The Fran Cosmo official fan site
 The World Classic Rockers official website

1956 births
Living people
Musicians from Utica, New York
Boston (band) members
American rock singers
American people of Italian descent
World Classic Rockers members